Cha Dong-min (Hangul: 차동민, Hanja: 車東旻; ; born August 24, 1986 in Seoul, South Korea) is a retired South Korean taekwondo practitioner.

Sports career

In 2008, he won the gold medal in the +80 kg category at the Beijing Olympic Games. 

He participated in the 2012 London Olympic Games to defend his title as the Number 1 seed in the 80 kg division, but was eliminated in the Quarterfinal round against Bahri Tanrıkulu of Turkey.

He competed for the 2016 Rio Olympics in the same division where he won a bronze medal. This was his last International competition, as he announced his retirement.

References

External links 
 

1986 births
Living people
South Korean male taekwondo practitioners
Olympic taekwondo practitioners of South Korea
Olympic gold medalists for South Korea
Taekwondo practitioners at the 2008 Summer Olympics
Taekwondo practitioners at the 2012 Summer Olympics
Taekwondo practitioners at the 2016 Summer Olympics
Olympic medalists in taekwondo
Medalists at the 2008 Summer Olympics
Korea National Sport University alumni
Medalists at the 2016 Summer Olympics
Olympic bronze medalists for South Korea
World Taekwondo Championships medalists
Asian Taekwondo Championships medalists
21st-century South Korean people